What I'm After may refer to:

 "What I'm After" (Ratt song)
 "What I'm After" (Lords of the Underground song)